Haydn Morris (14 July 1928 – 17 January 2021) was a Cardiff,  and British and Irish Lions international rugby union wing three-quarter.

Career
Morris was born in Mountain Ash, Rhondda Cynon Taf, and joined Cardiff from his home club Mountain Ash, playing on the left wing. He made his debut for Wales on 7 April 1951 versus France at Stade Colombes, and won two more caps in 1955 against Ireland and France, with a try in both matches. He was selected for the 1955 British Lions tour to South Africa, scoring nine tries in eight appearances, with a hat trick against Griqualand West. Morris was a student of Cardiff Training College and, whilst playing for Cardiff RFC, was sports master and 1st XV coach from September 1952 until 1960, at Barry Boys' Grammar School.

On 20 January 2021, it was announced that he had died, aged 92.

References

1928 births
2021 deaths
Barbarian F.C. players
British & Irish Lions rugby union players from Wales
Cardiff Metropolitan University RFC players
Cardiff RFC players
Mountain Ash RFC players
Rugby union players from Mountain Ash, Wales
Rugby union wings
Wales international rugby union players
Welsh rugby union players